WVRH (94.3 FM) is a radio station broadcasting a Contemporary Christian format. Licensed to Norlina, North Carolina, United States, the station is currently owned by Liberty University, Inc.

History
The station began broadcasting in 2001, and held the call sign WBDS. It was owned by CSN International and aired a Christian format. Its call sign was changed to WJIJ on August 9, 2001. In 2008, CSN International sold WJIJ, along with a number of other stations, to Calvary Radio Network, Inc. These stations were sold to Calvary Chapel Costa Mesa later that year. In 2010, Calvary Chapel Costa Mesa sold WJIJ and several other stations to Liberty University for $1.25 million, and the station's call sign was changed to WVRH.

References

External links

Liberty University
VRH
Contemporary Christian radio stations in the United States
Radio stations established in 2001
2001 establishments in North Carolina